Mario Ernesto Sánchez is a Cuban actor who founded Teatro Avante, a Hispanic theatre, in 1979 in Florida. He played various bit parts on Miami Vice and in Hollywood movies, including Invasion U.S.A. (1985) and The Specialist (1994).

Sánchez was born in Cuba. He went to the United States as a child during the Operation Pedro Pan. He appeared in the second episode of Miami Twice of classic British sitcom Only Fools and Horses as a Colombian drug baron.

External links 
 
 Miami Herald Latin spotlight July 6, 2007  

Year of birth missing (living people)
Living people
Cuban emigrants to the United States
American male television actors
Male actors from Florida
American entertainers of Cuban descent